{{DISPLAYTITLE:C9H7N}}
The molecular formula C9H7N (molar mass: 129.16 g/mol, exact mass: 129.0578 u) may refer to:

 Isoquinoline
 Quinoline

Molecular formulas